Liverpool is a city and port in Merseyside, England, which contains many listed buildings.  A listed building is a structure designated by English Heritage of being of architectural and/or of historical importance and, as such, is included in the National Heritage List for England.  There are three grades of listing, according to the degree of importance of the structure.  Grade I includes those buildings that are of "exceptional interest, sometimes considered to be internationally important"; the buildings in Grade II* are "particularly important buildings of more than special interest"; and those in Grade II are "nationally important and of special interest".  Very few buildings are included in Grade I — only 2.5% of the total.  Grade II* buildings represent 5.5% of the total, while the great majority, 92%, are included in Grade II.

Liverpool contains more than 1,550 listed buildings, of which 28 are in Grade I, 109 in Grade II*, and the rest in Grade II.  This list contains the Grade II listed buildings in the L1 postal district of Liverpool.  This area of the city formed part of the commercial hub of the city during the 19th and early 20th centuries.  From that time, and continuing into the present, it also contains the major shopping district of the city.  During the late 18th century, residential streets were developed in the area, the most important of these being Rodney Street, Duke Street, Seel Street and Bold Street.  Some of the buildings in these streets continue to be used for domestic use, others have been adapted for different purposes, including retail and professional.

Grade II listed buildings from other areas in the city can be found through the box on the right, along with the lists of the Grade I and Grade II* buildings in the city.

Buildings

See also
 Architecture of Liverpool

References
Notes

Citations

Sources

External links
 Liverpool City Council listed buildings information page

Buildings in Liverpool 01
Listed buildings in Liverpool 01
Liverpool-related lists